Eucopina tocullionana (or Eucosma tocullionana), the white pine cone borer, is a moth of the family Tortricidae. It is found in North America from Minnesota to Quebec, south in the Appalachian Mountains to northern Georgia.

The wingspan is about 18 mm. Adults can be found from early May to August. There is one generation per year.

The larvae feed in the cones of Pinus strobus and Pinus virginiana. Larvae can be found from mid-June to the end of August.

Gallery

References

Further reading

 

Moths described in 1920
Eucosmini